Philip Selwyn Abraham (29 July 1897 – 22 December 1955) was the Anglican Bishop of Newfoundland in Canada from 1942 until his death in 1955.

Born in Lichfield on 29 July 1897, he was educated at Eton College and New College, Oxford. After World War I service with the Royal Artillery he was ordained in 1923 and was a curate at Daybrook and St Mary Redcliffe, Bristol. Subsequently, he became the Precentor of Christ Church Cathedral, Montreal, then Vicar of Romford. He was consecrated as Coadjutor Bishop of Newfoundland on 1 August 1937 in Lambeth Palace Chapel and arrived in St. John's on 9 September. In 1942 he became the diocesan bishop. His father and grandfather were also bishops.

References

1897 births
People educated at Eton College
Alumni of New College, Oxford
Anglican bishops of Newfoundland
20th-century Anglican Church of Canada bishops
1955 deaths